Out of Nowhere is the fourth studio album by guitarist Vinnie Moore, released on April 16, 1996 through Mayhem Records.

Track listing

Personnel
Vinnie Moore – guitar, production
Brian Tichy – drums
Dorian Heartsong – bass
Paul Hammingson – engineering, mixing, production
Brian Stover – engineering
Brad Catiett – engineering
Thom Cadley – mixing
Greg Calbi – mastering

References

External links
In Review: Vinnie Moore "Out Of Nowhere" at Guitar Nine Records

Vinnie Moore albums
1996 albums
Albums recorded in a home studio